Tetraspanin-31 is a protein that in humans is encoded by the TSPAN31 gene.

The protein encoded by this gene is a member of the transmembrane 4 superfamily, also known as the tetraspanin family. Most of these members are cell-surface proteins that are characterized by the presence of four hydrophobic domains. The proteins mediate signal transduction events that play a role in the regulation of cell development, activation, growth and motility. This encoded protein is thought to be involved in growth-related cellular processes. This gene is associated with tumorigenesis and osteosarcoma.

References

Further reading